Sehar Fejzulahi (born 1 June 1985) is a Swiss former football player of Kosovar Albanian descent.

Club career
He signed for FC Winterthur on 11 February 2007 and moved to FC Vaduz in 2008.

References

External links
FC Vaduz profile

1985 births
People from Bujanovac
Kosovan emigrants to Switzerland
Swiss people of Albanian descent
Swiss people of Kosovan descent
Living people
Swiss men's footballers
Switzerland under-21 international footballers
FC Aarau players
FC Winterthur players
FC Vaduz players
FC Lugano players
FC Wil players
Grasshopper Club Zürich players
FC Schaffhausen players
FC Le Mont players
Swiss Super League players
Swiss Challenge League players
Swiss Promotion League players
Swiss 1. Liga (football) players
Association football midfielders
Swiss expatriate footballers
Expatriate footballers in Liechtenstein
Swiss expatriate sportspeople in Liechtenstein